Joyce Hedy Kurtz (born June 25, 1958 in Cleveland, Ohio), better known as Joyce Kurtz is a voice actress and founder of the loop group Joyce's Voices.

Some of her television credits are as follows:
Sharp Objects
Big Little Lies
Here and Now
Narcos
Claws
Bloodline
Berlin Station
The Vampire Diaries
The Originals
True Blood
Deadwood
Big Love
Dexter
The Following
Banshee
House M.D.
CSI: Miami
Eastbound and Down    
Swingtown

Film credits
Blindspotting ADR Coordinator 
Deathbook ADR Coordinator
3x3 Eyes as Lee Ling-Ling
Armitage III (OAV) as Armitage (credited as B. G. Mills)
The Professional: Golgo 13 as Dr. Zed
Vampire Hunter D as The Snake Sisters
Zillion: Burning Night as Sora Odama

Video games
Star Wars: Battlefront II as Princess Leia
Star Wars Rogue Squadron III: Rebel Strike as Princess Leia
Quest for Glory V as Julanar and Katrina

References

1958 births
20th-century American actresses
21st-century American actresses
Actresses from California
American voice actresses
Living people